Djamel Amani (born 17 June 1962 in Larbaâ, Algeria) is a retired Algerian professional footballer.

Club career
He played for USM Alger in Algeria, Royal Antwerp FC in Belgium and Aydınspor in Turkey.

International career
Amani was also part of the Algeria national football team, scoring 5 international goals.

References

External links

1962 births
Living people
People from Blida
Algerian footballers
Algeria international footballers
1990 African Cup of Nations players
Association football midfielders
Expatriate footballers in Turkey
Royal Antwerp F.C. players
USM Alger players
Aydınspor footballers
Süper Lig players
Algerian expatriate sportspeople in Turkey
Algerian expatriate footballers
Expatriate footballers in Belgium
Algerian expatriate sportspeople in Belgium
Africa Cup of Nations-winning players
21st-century Algerian people